SN 2005B, the second supernova discovered in 2005, was discovered by amateur astronomer Paul Gray, of Fredericton, New Brunswick, Canada, upon reviewing  film shot by fellow amateur astronomer David J. Lane, at his backyard observatory in Stillwater Lake, Nova Scotia, Canada.  It was located in the galaxy UGC 11066 in Draco.

References

Supernovae
Draco (constellation)
2005 in science
20050112